Major General Bruce Alexander McDonald,  (23 March 1925 – 23 March 1993) was a senior officer in the Australian Army, seeing service in the Second World War, the Indonesia-Malaysia Confrontation and the Vietnam War.

Early life and education
McDonald was born in Geelong, Victoria, on 23 March 1925, the son of Angus Alexander and Olive (née Penny) McDonald.

Military career
McDonald graduated from the Royal Military College, Duntroon in December 1944 and was posted to the 2/5th Battalion. He served in the later stages of the Second World War and was awarded a Military Cross for bravery and leadership while commanding a platoon during heavy fighting with the Japanese at Ulupu in New Guinea in July 1945, in which he was wounded.

Following the war McDonald served in a number of staff and regimental appointments. From 1963 to 1966 he commanded the 3rd Battalion, Royal Australian Regiment (3 RAR), including operations in West Malaysia in 1964 and in Borneo in 1965 during the Indonesia-Malaysia Confrontation, for which he was appointed an Officer of the Order of the British Empire.<ref
name=OBE>The Order of the British Empire – Officer (Military) (OBE(M)), Date granted: 1 January 1966, Citation: ARMY – Infantry – Distinguished service in Borneo</ref> During this period 3 RAR took part in the top secret Operation Claret, executing a number of cross border actions including several highly successful ambushes against Indonesian forces.

From early 1971 McDonald commanded the 1st Australian Task Force in South Vietnam until its withdrawal in early 1972, leading the formation during counter-insurgency operations against the Viet Cong and North Vietnamese during the Vietnam War. For this service he was awarded the Distinguished Service Order.<ref
name=DSO>Distinguished Service Order  (DSO), Date granted: 1 September 1972, Citation: 1 Australian Task Force Vietnam – Commanding</ref> He commanded the 1st Division in Queensland from 1975 to 1977, and later served as General Officer Commanding Training Command. McDonald was appointed an Officer of the Order of Australia in 1979.<ref
name=AO>Officer of the Order of Australia (Military) , (AO), Date granted: 11 June 1979, Citation: For service in positions of great responsibility, including General Officer Commanding, Training Command</ref>

Retirement
McDonald died in Brisbane, Queensland, on 23 March 1993. He was buried on 26 March 1993 in Pinnaroo cemetery, Brisbane.

Notes

References

 

1925 births
1993 deaths
Military personnel from Victoria (Australia)
Australian generals
Australian Army personnel of World War II
Australian military personnel of the Indonesia–Malaysia confrontation
Australian military personnel of the Vietnam War
Companions of the Distinguished Service Order
Officers of the Order of Australia
Officers of the Order of the British Empire
People from Geelong
Recipients of the Military Cross
Royal Military College, Duntroon graduates
Burials at Pinnaroo Cemetery, Brisbane